The FBI and ATF tracked 164 structure fires from arson that occurred May 27–30, 2020, during the George Floyd protests in Minneapolis–Saint Paul. Rioters started fires by igniting flammable materials within or next to buildings and in some cases by deploying Molotov cocktails. Property locations were damaged by spreading flames, heat, and smoke, and by suppressant waters from fire hoses and fire sprinkler systems. Many of the impacted structures suffered heavy damage or were destroyed, with some being reduced to piles of rubble after collapsing. 

The widespread acts of arson occurred in the aftermath of the murder of George Floyd on May 25, 2020, and affected properties in the cities of Minneapolis, Saint Paul, and Apple Valley in the U.S. state of Minnesota. Most acts of arson targeted commercial businesses, but schools, non-profit organizations, government offices, and private residences were also targeted by arsonists or indirectly affected by fire. The most notable arson damage was to the Minneapolis Police Department's third precinct police station that was overrun by demonstrators and set on fire the night of May 28. A few blocks away from the police station the same night, Oscar Lee Stewart Jr. died from inhalation and burn injuries after being trapped inside a pawn shop that had been set on fire. During several nights of chaos, fires displaced several dozen residents who evacuated affected houses or apartment buildings. 

After the rioting subsided, state and federal authorities had difficulty identifying those responsible for causing destruction. By May 2021, a year after the civil unrest over Floyd's murder, federal investigators had only filed arson charges against 17 people for damages at 11 properties in the Minneapolis–Saint Paul metropolitan region, despite arson affecting nearly 200 properties. In many instances, business owners were left paying for damages out of pocket as more than half of all riot-related losses were not covered by insurance. Some business owners raised money via GoFundMe campaigns or applied for recovery grants to reestablish operations, while many others opted not to rebuild their damaged properties, citing insufficient money or unacceptable financial risks.

Background 

Acts of arson in Minneapolis-Saint Paul occurred during a period of widespread civil disorder following the May 25, 2020, murder of George Floyd, an unarmed Black man, by Derek Chauvin, a White officer with the Minneapolis Police Department. During the arrest, Chauvin knelt on Floyd's neck for over nine minutes while Floyd was handcuffed and lying facedown in the street at the 38th and Chicago street intersection. While being pinned at his neck by Chauvin's knee, Floyd said repeatedly that he could not breathe, begged for help, and lost consciousness. Three other Minneapolis police officers assisted in the arrest and held a crowd of concerned onlookers back. Floyd was transported from the scene by ambulance and pronounced dead at a nearby hospital.

Floyd's murder was captured by a bystander video that quickly circulated widely in the media. Widespread outrage over the video's content led to the George Floyd protests, a global Black Lives Matter movement against structural racism and police brutality. While most people protesting Floyd's murder did so peacefully, mass demonstrations gave way to widespread rioting in Minneapolis, Saint Paul, and Twin Cities' suburbs in the five days after Floyd's murder. Nearly 1,500 property locations in the Minneapolis-Saint Paul metropolitan area suffered some type of property damage during the riots, such as by fire, looting, smashed windows or doors, graffiti, ransacking, or other forms of vandalism. At a cost of approximately $500 million, local unrest after the murder of George Floyd was the second most destructive in United States history, after the 1992 Los Angeles riots. About 60% of the financial losses from rioting in Minneapolis–Saint Paul were uninsured.

Property locations 
Arson damage occurred in Minneapolis, Saint Paul, and the Twin Cities’ suburb of Apple Valley between May 27 and May 30, 2020. Reports by government officials and the news media varied as to the number of property locations in the Minneapolis–Saint Paul metropolitan area that were damaged by fire, as some structure fires affected multiple businesses or adjacent structures. The FBI and ATF tracked 164 structure fires due to arson during the unrest. The federal government's number reflected buildings affected by arson and not individual acts of arson. Reporters for Bring Me The News, The Pioneer Press, and Star Tribune separately compiled lists of property damage with the help of reader submissions. Other news media reported on arson damage to specific property locations and businesses. In Minneapolis, the city's assessor published a database of damage to parcels, but it did not account for affected parcels with multiple buildings or for multi-use buildings. In Saint Paul, the city's fire department responded to 55 fires, but not all fires were to buildings.

Most properties affected by arson were commercial in nature, but the impact was felt beyond businesses. Arson fires damaged buildings containing schools, non-profit organizations, government services, and private residences. Many property locations owned and operated by ethnic minorities and immigrants were among those damaged by fire, as were several locations of national chain stores. In Minneapolis, 35 families were displaced by structure fires. During the riots, some business owners posted signs that the establishment was Black, minority, or independently owned, but the signs had varying success at dissuading damage. Some residents that lived in multi-buildings or above store fronts resorted to posting signs that people lived above or inside to persuade against arson. In the immediate aftermath of the riots, local officials estimated that rebuilding damaged commercial corridors in the Minneapolis–Saint Paul metropolitan area could take 10 years.

This list is of property locations that were damaged by arson fires during George Floyd protests in the Minneapolis–Saint Paul metropolitan region of the U.S. state of Minnesota. To be included on the list, the fire damage must be reported in a reliable source as occurring during the period of civil disorder in the five days after Floyd's murder on May 25, 2020. This list excludes freestanding objects that were set on fire during the riots, such as vehicles, bus shelters, trees, or piles of objects in the street. It also excludes intentional building fires that occurred during subsequent events of the 2020-2022 Minneapolis–Saint Paul racial unrest after May 2020.

Death 
This list includes local arson-related deaths in the five days after Floyd's murder.

Criminal charges 
In the United States, arson is classified as both a federal and state crime. Federal authorities assisted state and local authorities in tracking and investigating acts of arson that occurred during the George Floyd protests. Authorities, however, had difficulty identifying those responsible for causing arson damage. Investigations were prioritized for damage to structures with the most readily available evidence. Federal authorities brought criminal charges against 19 people, but two later had their charges dropped. Of the number of people with lasting charges, 15 out of the 17 were from Minnesota, but just three were from either the cities of Minneapolis or Saint Paul. Many of the acts of arson that resulted in criminal charges were those that were livestreamed or posted on social media accounts by the arsonists.

Assigning who was responsible for the damage became a topic of political debate. Right-wing politicians blamed Antifa and radical leftists. Left-wing politicians blamed white supremacists and drug cartels. An FBI analysis of state and federal criminal charges, however, found that disorganized crowds had no single goal or affiliation, many opportunist crowds amassed spontaneously during periods of lawlessness, and that people causing destruction had contradictory motives for their actions. Of all of those charged for arson-related crimes, only one charging document noted any ties to an extremist organizationthe Boogaloo movement. The majority of those charged federally for arson crimes were described by local newspapers as White Americans who had contradictory motives for their actions.

This list includes federal convictions for arson and arson-related acts in the five days after Floyd's murder.

See also 
 Fire investigation
 List of incidents of civil unrest in Minneapolis–Saint Paul
 Minneapolis Fire Department
 National Register of Historic Places listings in Hennepin County, Minnesota
 Violence and controversies during the George Floyd protests

References

Further reading 
 Wright, Bruce C.T. (May 29, 2020). "Minneapolis Descends Into Fiery Chaos As Trump Threatens Protesting ‘THUGS’ With ‘Shooting’". News One. Retrieved May 5, 2022.
 "Aerial video of Minneapolis shows aftermath of rioting, looting" (10 June 2020). Star Tribune. Retrieved May 5, 2022.
 Say His Name: Five Days for George Floyd. PBS. Aired May 25, 2021.
 Janzer, Cinnamon (January 28, 2001). "The Collective at the Heart of Longfellow Rising." EnterMN.com.  Retrieved January 28, 2021.

External links 

 ATF Releases related to the 2020 Twin Cities Unrest, June 9, 2021.

2020 fires in the United States
2020 in Minnesota
2020s in Minneapolis
May 2020 crimes in the United States
Arson in the 2020s
Arson in the United States
21st century in Saint Paul, Minnesota
African-American riots in the United States
Minneapolis–Saint Paul
George Floyd protests in Minneapolis–Saint Paul
Riots and civil disorder in Minnesota
Articles containing video clips
Civil rights protests in the United States
History of African-American civil rights
Post–civil rights era in African-American history
Race and crime in the United States
Incidents during the George Floyd protests
Arson in Minnesota
arson
arson